The Men's club throw (category A) was one of the events held in Athletics at the 1960 Summer Paralympics in Rome.

There were only three competitors; all three therefore won a medal. Great Britain's Dick Thompson achieved a throw of 34.85m, taking the gold medal.

References 

Club
1960